The party whip of the People's Action Party is responsible for ensuring that the People's Action Party (PAP) Members of Parliament (MPs) attend and vote according to the party's line. The party whip also assists the Parliament in completing its business by listing the speaking MPs and the time required for each item of business. The incumbent party whip is Janil Puthucheary, who was appointed on 6 June 2019.

The party's Central Executive Committee (CEC) will appoint the party whip along with two deputy party whips.

List of party whips

List of deputy party whips

References 

Political whips